The Isle of Doagh (Irish: Oileán na Dumhcha, meaning "Isle of the Dune"; also known in English as Doagh Isle or Doagh Island) is a small peninsula in the north of Inishowen on the north coast of County Donegal in Ulster, Ireland. It once was an island.  Over time, the channel between Doagh and the mainland silted up and it became joined to the mainland. Nevertheless, the area continued to be referred as the Isle of Doagh or Doagh Island.  The area comprises five townlands; Ballymacmoriarty, Carrickabraghy, Carrowreagh, Fegart and Lagacurry. Doagh Island is very near the village of Ballyliffin.

The ruins of Carrickabraghy Castle stands at the north-western extremity of the peninsula.

History

Neolithic period 
The Isle of Doagh has one of the largest clusters of rock art sites in Ireland. The markings are around 4000–5000 years old.

Early medieval period 
The Island was a stronghold of the Lords of Carraig Bhrachai who were part of the Ó Maolfabhail sept (anglicised McFall). There are numerous references to the inhabitants of the Isle of Doagh, in particular Carrickabraghy, in the Annals of the Four Masters. The earliest historical reference to Carrickabraghy is in 834, when Niall Caille led an army into Leinster. The Annals refer to one of his officers, Fearghas, son of Badhbhchadh, who was Lord of Carraig Bhrachai. According to the Annals, Fearghas was killed by Munster men during the campaign.

17th and 18th centuries 
Several townlands within the Isle of Doagh are mentioned in the 1665 Hearth money rolls: a tax levied on chimneys whose revenues were used to support the Royal Household. A total of 18 households paid the tax from "Lagacurry, Fegurt, Carickbracky, Carowreagh, and Ballym'Murty", of which 11 households carried the name of "O'Dougherty". In the 1654 Civil Survey, these townlands are also referred to as the property of The 1st Earl of Donegall (who also held the subsidiary title Viscount Chichester). The survey provided some limited information about economic activities in the area, which were the cultivation of oats, barley, wheat and rye. There was also some salmon and seal fishing. Lord Donegall was also the main landlord in Carrickfergus and Belfast.

19th century shipwrecks 
The coastline around the Isle of Doagh is notoriously hazardous for shipping and fishing. Throughout the 19th century, there were a number of maritime accidents nearby:  

 On 24 November 1841, a schooner, the James Cook, struck some rocks near Glashedy Island and broke up. The master and nine crew drowned.  
 On the morning of 22 April 1847, seven fishermen from the Isle of Doagh were drowned. In relatively calm weather, their boat capsized while crossing the Bay of Strabega after it was hit by a sudden swell. The dead were Donald Doherty, owner of the boat, who left a wife and six children; Patrick Doherty, who left a wife and three children; James McLoughlin (or McLaughlin), a wife and four children; Patrick (Roe) Doherty, a wife and one child; William Doherty, a young unmarried man; Hugh McCool, who was unmarried; and John McLoughlin (or McLaughlin), a widow's son, and her only support. William Doherty, the eighth person on board, escaped by swimming ashore. 
 In March 1878, a large barque called the Danube ran aground on the Isle during a severe storm. It was sailing from Liverpool to New York. It lost its masts and began to drift aimlessly. Two coastguards from Malin Head put out in a small boat and reached the vessel. The rescue craft was hit by a huge wave, and one of the coastguards was drowned. Subsequently, a line was floated ashore by means of a barrel, and the crew, twelve in number, were hauled ashore safely.  
 In September 1847, a brig heading for Greenock ran around on the Isle of Doagh.

Poitín production 
During the 19th century, poitín was illegally produced in the area. In April 1898, the Royal Irish Constabulary (R.I.C.) conducted a mass raid on homes on the Isle and found illegally distilled spirits in several locations. Prosecutions of local inhabitants for illegal distillation were commonplace. For example, in August 1878, the home of a widow called Mary McGeoghegan, from Maheranoll, Isle of Doagh, was raided by the R.I.C. The constabulary found a jar containing one gallon and a half of illicit spirits concealed in her potato garden at the rear of her house. Opposite her kitchen door, they found a still that had been used for illicit distillation. A month later, at the Malin Petty Sessions, she was fined £6.

The Irish Famine 
The potato blight and the subsequent famine devastated the Isle of Doagh.  Despite the obvious hardship caused by the failure of the potato crop, landlords continued to evict tenants. In May 1848, the Weekly Vindicator Newspaper reported that a large contingent of police and bailiffs entered the Isle of Doagh and evicted between 20 and 30 families. Tenants had been previously confronted with a doubling of their rents.

In June 1848, the Belfast Vindicator reported that in Feggart, Isle of Doagh 53 people had died of hunger. Moreover, the newspaper provided a list of the victims; James McLoughlin, his wife and three children; Owen McLoughlin, and his six children; "Widow" Diver, and her two sons; Patrick Doherty and his wife; "Widow" Doherty and her two children; Patrick James Doherty, his wife, and three children; "Widow: McCoal and five children;  Charles McLoughlin, his wife, and three children; Neal Doherty, his wife, and four children; Patrick, Daniel, Nancy, and Catherine Doherty; William McRory, his wife and five children.

Rural unrest 
The Land League, which campaigned for agrarian reform, was active on the Isle.  In 1880, John Mooney, a process-server, was attacked by a large crowd while he was serving a writ for a debt.  Mooney took refuge in the local school but was forced out and made to swear on his knees that he would never serve any writs again.  Five local men were subsequently arrested and tried at Carndonagh Magistrates. However, the men were acquitted after Mooney, the school master and other witnesses refused to identify the men as assailants.

Second World War 
In February 1941, a mine washed up on a local beach.  It was detonated by Irish Army troops stationed at Fort Lenan.  The explosion shook houses up to ten miles away.

Carrickabraghy Castle 
At the extreme westward point of the Isle of Doagh is Carrickabraghy Castle, which is sometimes known as Doherty's Castle.  The Castle stands on a large rock known as Friar's Rock. The castle was constructed in the late 16th century and it was last inhabited in 1665. The structure of the castle included an oval bawn and seven circular towers. The bawn and towers enclosed a keep. To the south of the keep stood a small tower which is believed to have belonged to a church. The walls of the castle are 3 ft 9 inches wide.

Doagh Famine Village 
In Lagacurry, a collection of traditional Irish houses have been transformed into a folk museum.  The museum illustrates community living from the mid-19th century times right up to the present day.

Glashedy Island 

Glashedy (Irish: Glaiséidí) is a rock island approximately 3 kilometres (2 mi) west of the Isle of Doagh. It is currently uninhabited.  Its former name until the early 19th century was Seale Island.  At various times, the Island has been used to farm sheep.  The 1654 Civil Survey indicates that the Island was also used as a base for seal fishing.

Notable people
Stephen McLaughlin (born 1990), footballer

References

Peninsulas of County Donegal